Flag of Madrid may refer to:

 Flag of the City of Madrid
 Flag of the Community of Madrid